Hydroginella rugosa is a species of sea snail, a marine gastropod mollusc in the family Marginellidae, the margin snails.

Description
The length of the shell attains 7.7 mm.

Distribution
This marine species occurs off Fiji.

References

Marginellidae
Gastropods described in 2003